David Owen Russell (born August 20, 1958) is an American filmmaker. His early directing career includes the comedy films Spanking the Monkey (1994), Flirting with Disaster (1996), Three Kings (1999), and I Heart Huckabees (2004). He gained critical success with the biographical sports drama The Fighter (2010), the romantic comedy-drama Silver Linings Playbook (2012), and the dark comedy crime film American Hustle (2013). The three films were commercially successful and acclaimed by critics, having earned Russell three Academy Award nominations for Best Director, as well as a Best Adapted Screenplay nomination for Silver Linings Playbook and a Best Original Screenplay nomination for American Hustle. Russell received his seventh Golden Globe nomination for the semi-biographical comedy-drama Joy (2015).

Early life 
Russell was raised in Larchmont, New York, in an atheist, middle-class household. His parents worked for Simon & Schuster; his father, Bernard, was the vice president of sales for the company, and his mother, Maria, was a secretary there. His father was from a Russian-Jewish family, and his mother was Italian-American (of Lucanian descent). His paternal grandfather, a butcher from the Upper West Side of Manhattan, lost many of his relatives in concentration camps.

When he was 13, Russell made his first film for a school project and used a Super 8 film camera to film people in New York City. He attended Mamaroneck High School, where he was voted "Class Rebel". He fell in love with film in his teens (his favorite movies included Taxi Driver, Chinatown, and Shampoo) but aspired to become a writer; Russell started a newspaper in high school and wrote short stories. As his parents worked in the publishing industry, he grew up in a household filled with books.

In 1981, Russell received his A.B. degree from Amherst College, where he majored in English and political science. He wrote his senior thesis on the United States intervention in Chile from 1963 to 1973.

Career

Early career 
After graduating from Amherst, Russell traveled to Nicaragua and taught in a Sandinista literacy program. He worked in waitering, bartending, and catering. Some of his bartending colleagues included members of the Blue Man Group. He worked for a booksellers' association and later became a community organizer in Maine. He used video equipment to document slums and bad housing conditions, which later became a documentary of Lewiston, Maine. Russell was a political activist and canvassed and raised money in neighborhoods; he also did community work in Boston's South End. In addition to working in several day jobs, he began to write short films.

Russell directed a documentary about Panamanian immigrants in Boston, which led to a job as a production assistant on a PBS series called Smithsonian World.

In 1987, Russell wrote, produced, and directed Bingo Inferno: A Parody on American Obsessions, a short film about an obsessive bingo-playing mother. Two years later, he made another short titled Hairway to the Stars, which featured Bette Davis and William Hickey. Both shorts were shown at the Sundance Film Festival.

After Russell made an award-winning short film for a Boston television station, he received grants from the New York State Council on the Arts and the National Endowment for the Arts. Instead of the money going towards a feature about a fortune cookie writer, he decided to make Spanking the Monkey, a film about an incestuous mother-son relationship. As a result, Russell had to return the funds to the NEA.

Spanking the Monkey, the 1994 independent dark comedy, was his first directorial effort. The film was produced by Dean Silvers, and starred Jeremy Davies as a troubled young man and Alberta Watson as his lonely mother. Despite the controversial subject matter, the film received critical acclaim and won him Best First Screenplay and Best First Feature from the Independent Spirit Awards, as well as the Audience Award at the Sundance Film Festival.

1990s 
Flirting with Disaster

His next project was the Miramax comedy Flirting with Disaster (1996), his second collaboration with Dean Silvers, and first with Harvey Weinstein. The film follows a neurotic man (Ben Stiller) who travels with his wife (Patricia Arquette) and a high-strung caseworker (Téa Leoni) to find his biological parents. The film also starred Mary Tyler Moore, George Segal, Alan Alda, Josh Brolin, Richard Jenkins, and Lily Tomlin. It was screened in the Un Certain Regard section at the Cannes Film Festival, and was well received by most critics.  Roger Ebert said of the direction, "Russell finds the strong central line all screwball begins with, the seemingly serious mission or quest, and then throws darts at a map of the United States as he creates his characters." Lisa Schwarzbaum of Entertainment Weekly gave the film a 'B' and declared it "one of the ha-ha funniest comedies currently at a theater near you."

Three Kings

The success of those two films led to the satirical Gulf War black comedy Three Kings (1999), starring George Clooney, Mark Wahlberg, Ice Cube and Spike Jonze. Adapted from an earlier script by former stand-up comic John Ridley, the film follows three American GIs who devise a plan to steal hidden Kuwaiti gold during the 1991 Iraqi uprising against Saddam Hussein.  Filmed in the deserts of Arizona, California and Mexico, and featuring actual Iraqi refugees as extras, Russell used several unique cinematic techniques to achieve a feeling of realism.  He filmed using handheld cameras and Steadicam, and shot on Ektachrome slide photography stock that was cross processed in colour negative chemicals, to reproduce "the odd colour of the newspaper images [of the Gulf War]." He also insisted on filming all of the explosions in one shot, unlike a typical action film.

Three Kings was released in 1999 and was his biggest critical and financial success.  It grossed $60 million in the United States and over $100 million worldwide.  It holds a 94% at Rotten Tomatoes, with the consensus "Three Kings successfully blends elements of action, drama, and comedy into a thoughtful, exciting movie on the Gulf War."  It ended up being the first of several collaborations with Mark Wahlberg.

2000s 
I Heart Huckabees

Russell's next project was the existential comedy I Heart Huckabees (2004). During pre-production in 2003, it was reported that Jude Law dropped the film to star in Christopher Nolan's The Prestige (2006), but after Russell headlocked Nolan at a Hollywood party, demanding that "his fellow director show artistic solidarity and give up his star in order to save Huckabees", Nolan dropped Law from his film. The film ended up receiving mixed reviews and underperformed at the box office, but recent collaborator Jennifer Lawrence called it her favorite David O. Russell film.

Nailed

Nailed is a political comedy co-written by Russell and Kristin Gore, and stars Jessica Biel, Jake Gyllenhaal, Tracy Morgan, Catherine Keener, Paul Reubens, James Brolin and Kirstie Alley. Production was delayed or shut down four times in 2008, resulting in IATSE shutting down production because the crew was not getting paid. Actor James Caan left mid-production "due to creative differences and [the] split was amicable."

The film revolves around the character of Alice Eckle (played by Jessica Biel) who gets accidentally shot in the head with a nail by a clumsy workman, eliciting wild sexual urges. The uninsured Eckle goes on a crusade to Washington to fight for the rights of the bizarrely injured. She meets an immoral congressman (Jake Gyllenhaal) who takes advantage of her sex drive and capitalizes on her crusade as Eckle heads into her own career in politics.  Russell ceased working on the film in 2010; it was retitled Accidental Love and was released on VOD on February 10, 2015, before a limited release on March 20, 2015

2010s 
The Fighter

In 2010, Russell returned with The Fighter, a biographical sports drama produced by and starring Mark Wahlberg. The film focuses on junior welterweight boxer Mickey Ward's rise to claim the WBU Light Welterweight title, as well as his difficult relationship with his mother, Alice Ward (Melissa Leo), and his older half-brother Dickie Eklund (Christian Bale).  The film became a major critical and financial success, grossing $125 million, and appearing on several critics' year-end top ten lists. The Fighter also received seven Academy Award nominations, including Best Picture and Best Director for Russell, the first of his career, and earned awards for both Bale and Leo, for Best Supporting Actor and Best Supporting Actress, respectively.

Silver Linings Playbook

Silver Linings Playbook was adapted from the serio-comic novel by Matthew Quick. Bradley Cooper plays Pat and Robert De Niro, who starred with Cooper in Limitless, co-stars as his father. Jennifer Lawrence plays the lead female role of Tiffany. She commented about Russell, "He's really my favorite director since I started watching movies." The cast also includes Jacki Weaver, Chris Tucker and the veteran Bollywood actor Anupam Kher. The film was released in the United States and Canada on November 16, 2012.

Russell received the Hollywood Director Award at the 16th annual Hollywood Film Awards and an Indie Impact Award at the Palm Springs International Film Festival for his work on the film, as well as two Independent Spirit Awards (Best Director, Best Screenplay), two Satellite Awards (Best Director, Best Adapted Screenplay), a BAFTA Film Award (Adapted Screenplay), and the AFI Award for Movie of the Year.  Silver Linings Playbook won the People's Choice Award at the 2012 Toronto International Film Festival and garnered four Golden Globe Award nominations (with one win for Jennifer Lawrence, Best Performance by an Actress in a Motion Picture – Musical or Comedy) and eight Academy Award nominations, including Best Picture, Best Director (Russell), Best Adapted Screenplay (Russell), Best Actor in a Leading Role (Bradley Cooper), Best Actress in a Leading Role (winner, Jennifer Lawrence), Best Supporting Actor (Robert De Niro), Best Supporting Actress (Jacki Weaver) and Best Film Editing (Jay Cassidy and Crispin Struthers).

Silver Linings Playbook is about a former teacher named Pat Solitano (Bradley Cooper), who suffers from bipolar disorder, and moves back in with his family.  He is initially obsessive about reuniting with his spouse after having discovered her with a lover and assaulting the man; however, the story explores the development of his relationship with Tiffany Maxwell (Jennifer Lawrence). The film was inspired by Devereaux Glenholme School, a 12-month special education boarding school in Washington, CT. Russell's son is currently a student there, and Russell stated, "I was so familiar with the issues in the story that I knew how emotional and funny and original it could be. Without this community I would never have made this film."

American Hustle

Russell's next project was American Hustle (2013), a comedy based on the ABSCAM scandal of the 1970s. The film's plot revolved around skilled con artists Irving Rosenfeld (Christian Bale) and Sydney Prosser (Amy Adams) being forced to work for unhinged FBI Agent Richie DiMaso (Bradley Cooper). Their complicated operation eventually involves Mayor Carmine Polito (Jeremy Renner) of Camden, New Jersey, as well as Irving's unpredictable wife Rosalyn (Jennifer Lawrence). The film reunited Russell with Bale and Adams after The Fighter, as well as with Cooper, Lawrence, and De Niro after Silver Linings Playbook. Saïd Taghmaoui, the Iraqi captain from Three Kings, also makes an appearance.

The film received seven Golden Globe nominations, including Best Motion Picture Comedy & Best Director for Russell, and three wins including Best Motion Picture Comedy, Best Actress for Amy Adams and Best Supporting Actress for Jennifer Lawrence. Additionally, the film received ten Academy Award nominations, including Best Picture, Best Director, Best Actor, Best Actress, Best Supporting Actor and Best Supporting Actress, along with a Screen Actors Guild Award win for Outstanding Performance by a Cast in a Motion Picture.

Joy

In January 2014, it was announced that Russell would rewrite and direct a comedy-drama film about American inventor and entrepreneur Joy Mangano, a struggling Long Island single mother of three children. Jennifer Lawrence played the lead role in the film. Principal photography began on February 17, 2015, and the film, titled Joy, was released on December 25, 2015.

The film received mixed to positive reviews, focusing mainly on the strong central performance by actor Jennifer Lawrence, Russell's direction, and the  supporting performances by Diane Ladd, Robert De Niro, and others. Featured music in the film was a driving force behind the narrative, including a reworked a cappella version of Cream's "I Feel Free". Strong box office greeted the film's first five days, with a $5900-per-screen average, and 25 million dollars in gross receipts, according to Box Office Mojo; it grossed a worldwide total of over $101 million.

The film was nominated for 2 Golden Globe Awards, including Best Musical or Comedy, and Best Actress in a Musical or Comedy for Jennifer Lawrence, which she won. Lawrence was also nominated for the Academy Award for Best Actress, the film's only Oscar nomination.

Past Forward

Written and directed by Russell, Past Forward was a short film collaboration between the director and Prada. A clip of the film premiered in September 2016 at Milan Fashion Week, and premiered November 2016 in Los Angeles. In the short film, Russell uses three actors for the same roles including Kuoth Wiel, Freida Pinto and Allison Williams. The film has been described as a "surreal dreamscape with an eclectic cast replaying scenes in shifting combinations".

2020s 
Amsterdam

In January 2020, it was announced that Russell would be writing and directing Amsterdam, produced by Regency Enterprises. Russell will be teaming up with Christian Bale for the third time, with Margot Robbie also joining the film. In October 2020 it was announced that John David Washington had joined the cast of the film, with filming scheduled to begin in January 2021. The same month that filming began, Rami Malek and Zoe Saldaña joined the cast. A trailer was released in July 2022, announcing the casting of Chris Rock, Anya Taylor-Joy, Mike Myers, Michael Shannon, Andrea Riseborough, Matthias Schoenaerts, Alessandro Nivola, Taylor Swift, and Robert De Niro.

Upcoming projects 
On February 9, 2023 it was announced that Keke Palmer and Sacha Baron Cohen will star in O. Russell's Super Toys. The film is a period piece set in the 1970s.

Ghetto Film School 
David O. Russell is on the board of Ghetto Film School (GFS), an organization that was founded in 2000 to educate American storytellers. Russell learned about GFS in 2002 from two students who introduced him to Joe Hall, president of Ghetto Film School. Shortly after, Russell joined the board of the organization.

Along with fellow board members, Russell brought filmmaker friends, industry and movie studio professionals to donate money and lend their time teaching classes to support young black and Latino filmmakers from the South Bronx and Harlem.

On June 16, 2014, Ghetto Film School opened its new branch in Los Angeles. This was thanks in part to Russell with an assist from 21st Century Fox co-COO James Murdoch.

In October 2015, Russell and Jim Gianopulos hosted the premiere of Ghetto Film School Los Angeles fellows' thesis film Demon's Gate.

Frequent collaborators 
Editor Jay Cassidy worked with Russell on Silver Linings Playbook, American Hustle, Joy, and Amsterdam. Crispin Struthers and Alan Baumgarten also edited several films for Russell. Producers Dean Silvers, Megan Ellison, and Jonathan Gordon have worked with him two and three times, respectively. Linus Sandgren was cinematographer for American Hustle and Joy.

Personal life 
Russell was married to Janet Grillo, who was a producer at Fine Line Features, from 1992 to 2007. He has been with his partner, Holly Davis, since 2007. Davis is a costume designer. Russell has two children: one with Grillo and an adopted son with Davis. He resides in Santa Monica, California, and is an advocate for mental illness treatment and support, and an active supporter of autism research. Russell's efforts saw him named the Essential Puzzle Piece honoree by the Light Up the Night Gala for Autism.

In 2013, Russell visited Washington, D.C., to meet with vice president Joe Biden and Sen. Debbie Stabenow to discuss a new bill regarding mental healthcare. In May 2014, Russell participated in a panel at Paley Center for the Media that discussed projects that have brought to light the stigmas and suffering associated with mental illness. Russell serves on the creative council of Represent.Us, a nonpartisan anti-corruption organization.

Controversies

On-set behavior 
Over the years Russell has gained a reputation for being combative and abusive towards actors in his films, notably George Clooney, Lily Tomlin, and Amy Adams.

His reputation extends off-set, allegedly physically assaulting filmmaker Christopher Nolan at a 2003 party in Hollywood.

1998 incident  
During filming, news spread of Russell and George Clooney nearly having a fistfight on the set of Three Kings. In a 2000 interview, Clooney described his confrontation with Russell after tensions on the set had been steadily increasing. According to Clooney, Russell was demeaning the crew verbally and physically. Clooney felt this was out of line and told Russell, "David, it's a big day. But you can't shove, push or humiliate people who aren't allowed to defend themselves." After that, the confrontation escalated when, according to Sharon Waxman in her book, Rebels on the Backlot, Russell actually head-butted Clooney and Clooney grabbed Russell by the throat. Clooney said Russell eventually apologized and filming continued, but Clooney described the incident as "truly, without exception, the worst experience of my life." When asked if he would work with Russell again, Clooney responded, "Life's too short." 

In early 2012, Clooney indicated that he and Russell had mended their relationship, saying "We made a really, really great film, and we had a really rough time together, but it's a case of both of us getting older. I really do appreciate the work he continues to do, and I think he appreciates what I'm trying to do."

2003 incident 
Russell had conflicts with Lily Tomlin during the filming of I Heart Huckabees, and in March 2007, two videos were leaked onto YouTube portraying on-set arguments between Russell and Tomlin, in which among other things he called her sexist names. 

These abusive tirades by Russell were first reported in a 2004 The New York Times article by Sharon Waxman in which she describes him calling Tomlin "the crudest word imaginable, in front of the actors and crew." Additionally Waxman describes Russell storming off the set and back on again, continually shouting, which is corroborated by the leaked videos. On the set, actors were sometimes driven to their wits' ends after hours of takes. Afterward, Tomlin remarked that she and Russell are "fine", saying, "I'd rather have someone human and available and raw and open. Don't give me someone cold, or cut off, or someone who considers themselves dignified." 

In a 2011 interview with Movieline, Tomlin was asked about the incident and she replied: It happens sometimes—but David is a very mercurial person, and that's part of why he's so brilliant. He almost reflects the movie. I did two movies with him, and I Heart Huckabees was so crazy, so all over the place, I think he kind of embodies intuitively whatever he's trying to make happen. It was just crazy, crazy stuff. We were always doing something, and then we'd get manic and crazy and I just flipped out on him. Then he flipped out on me. And you know, stuff goes on. But it's nothing. It's like family. If you have a big fight in your family, usually it's treated that way on the set. We don't want to misbehave; believe me, it's embarrassing. It's humiliating, you know? Because you just lose it. You act like a crazy person. [Laughs] But I adore David. I adore him as a talent. A lot of my friends said, "Well, you won't work with him again." I said, "Of course I would! I adore him, I love him. He's brilliant."

During the 2012 Gotham Awards, host Mike Birbiglia roasted Russell by reading a transcript of Russell's argument with Lily Tomlin. The event, specifically the joke and what transpired around it, later formed a large part of Birbiglia's show, Thank God for Jokes.

2013 incident 
According to Salon, in the Sony Pictures Entertainment hack, it was revealed that Russell made Amy Adams' life "a living hell" during the production of American Hustle, and Christian Bale at one point intervened. Salon reported that, in an email to Sony chief Michael Lynton, journalist Jonathan Alter said: "He grabbed one guy by the collar, cursed out people repeatedly in front of others and so abused Amy Adams that Christian Bale got in his face and told him to stop acting like an asshole." 

Adams confirmed the story in a 2016 British GQ interview stating, "He was hard on me, that's for sure. It was a lot ... I was really just devastated on set". She also added she wouldn't want to work with the director again. Adams also explained, "Jennifer [Lawrence] doesn't take any of it on. She's Teflon. And I am not Teflon. But I also don't like to see other people treated badly. It's not OK with me."

Sexual misconduct allegation 
In December 2011, Russell's 19-year-old transgender niece, Nicole Peloquin, filed a police report alleging Russell had sexually assaulted her. The case was closed without any charges being filed because the alleged assault wasn't witnessed by police. According to the police report, Russell offered to help Peloquin with abdominal exercises, during which his hand hovered above her genitals. After inquiring about the hormones she used to increase breast size, Russell slipped his hands under her shirt and felt both breasts. 

Russell confirmed that the incident happened, but told police that Peloquin was "acting very provocative toward him" and invited him to feel her breasts. He also admitted to being "curious about the breast enhancement." This incident was also directly mentioned in the 2014 Sony Pictures hack.

Awards and nominations

Filmography

Film 

Acting credits

Short films

Television

Notes

References

Further reading 
.

External links 

1958 births
American people of Italian descent
American male screenwriters
American film producers
American film directors
American people of Russian-Jewish descent
American writers of Italian descent
Amherst College alumni
Best Adapted Screenplay BAFTA Award winners
Best Director AACTA International Award winners
Best Original Screenplay BAFTA Award winners
Best Screenplay AACTA International Award winners
Film directors from New York City
Film producers from New York (state)
Independent Spirit Award winners
Independent Spirit Award for Best Director winners
Living people
People from Larchmont, New York
Writers from Manhattan
Screenwriters from New York (state)
Mamaroneck High School alumni